In chemistry, photocatalysis is the acceleration of a photoreaction in the presence of a photocatalyst, the excited state of which "repeatedly interacts with the reaction partners forming reaction intermediates and regenerates itself after each cycle of such interactions." In many cases, the catalyst is a solid that upon irradiation with UV- or visible light generates electron–hole pairs that generate free radicals.

History

Early mentions (1911–1938) 
The earliest mention came in 1911, when German chemist Dr. Alexander Eibner integrated the concept in his research of the illumination of zinc oxide (ZnO) on the bleaching of the dark blue pigment, Prussian blue. Around this time, Bruner and Kozak published an article discussing the deterioration of oxalic acid in the presence of uranyl salts under illumination, while in 1913, Landau published an article explaining the phenomenon of photocatalysis. Their contributions led to the development of actinometric measurements, measurements that provide the basis of determining photon flux in photochemical reactions. After a hiatus, in 1921, Baly et al. used ferric hydroxides and colloidal uranium salts as catalysts for the creation of formaldehyde under visible light.

In 1938 Doodeve and Kitchener discovered that  , a highly-stable and non-toxic oxide, in the presence of oxygen could act as a photosensitizer for bleaching dyes, as ultraviolet light absorbed by  led to the production of active oxygen species on its surface, resulting in the blotching of organic chemicals via photooxidation. This was the first observation of the fundamental characteristics of heterogeneous photocatalysis.

1964–1981 
In 1970, Formenti et al. and Tanaka and Blyholde observed the oxidation of various alkenes and the photocatalytic decay of N2O, respectively.

A breakthrough occurred in 1972, when Akira Fujishima and Kenichi Honda discovered that electrochemical photolysis of water occurred when a  electrode irradiated with ultraviolet light was electrically connected to a platinum electrode. As the ultraviolet light was absorbed by the  electrode, electrons flowed from the anode to the platinum cathode where hydrogen gas was produced. This was one of the first instances of hydrogen production from a clean and cost-effective source, as the majority of hydrogen production comes from natural gas reforming and gasification. Fujishima's and Honda's findings led to other advances. In 1977, Nozik discovered that the incorporation of a noble metal in the electrochemical photolysis process, such as platinum and gold, among others, could increase photoactivity, and that an external potential was not required.

Photocatalysis has not been developed for commercial purposes. Chu et al. (2017) assessed the future of electrochemical photolysis of water, discussing its major challenge of developing a cost-effective, energy-efficient photoelectrochemical (PEC) tandem cell, which would, “mimic natural photosynthesis".

Types of photocatalysis

Homogeneous photocatalysis
In homogeneous photocatalysis, the reactants and the photocatalysts exist in the same phase. A intensively studied theme in homogeneous photocatalysis involves the destruction of ozone:

Heterogeneous photocatalysis
In heterogeneous catalysis the catalyst is in a different phase from the reactants. Heterogeneous photocatalysis is a discipline which includes a large variety of reactions: mild or total oxidations, dehydrogenation, hydrogen transfer, 18O2–16O2 and deuterium-alkane isotopic exchange, metal deposition, water detoxification, and gaseous pollutant removal.

Most heterogeneous photocatalysts are transition metal oxides and semiconductors. Unlike metals, which have a continuum of electronic states, semiconductors possess a void energy region where no energy levels are available to promote recombination of an electron and hole produced by photoactivation in the solid. The void region of energy, which extends from the top of the filled valence band to the bottom of the vacant conduction band, is called the band gap. When a photon with energy equal to or greater than the material's band gap is absorbed by the semiconductor, an electron is excited from the valence band to the conduction band, generating a hole in the valence band. Such a photogenerated electron-hole pair is termed an exciton. The excited electron and hole can recombine and release the energy gained from the excitation of the electron as heat. Such exciton recombination is undesirable and higher levels cost efficieny. Efforts to develop functional photocatalysts often emphasize extending exciton lifetime, improving electron-hole separation using diverse approaches that may rely on structural features such as phase hetero-junctions (e.g. anatase-rutile interfaces), noble-metal nanoparticles, silicon nanowires and substitutional cation doping. The ultimate goal of photocatalyst design is to facilitate reactions of the excited electrons with oxidants to produce reduced products, and/or reactions of the generated holes with reductants to produce oxidized products. Due to the generation of positive holes and excited electrons, oxidation-reduction reactions take place at the surface of semiconductors irradiated with light.

In one mechanism of the oxidative reaction, holes react with the moisture present on the surface and produce a hydroxyl radical. The reaction starts by photo-induced exciton generation in the metal oxide (MO) surface:

MO + hν  →  MO (h+ + e−)

Oxidative reactions due to photocatalytic effect:

h+ + H2O → H+ + •OH         	
2 h+ + 2 H2O → 2 H+ + H2O2   	
H2O2→ 2 •OH
                  	
Reductive reactions due to photocatalytic effect:

e− + O2 → •O2−		
•O2− + H2O + H+ → H2O2 + O2
H2O2 → 2 •OH

Ultimately, hydroxyl radicals are generated in both reactions. These radicals are oxidative in nature and nonselective with a redox potential of E0 = +3.06 V.

 is a common choice for heterogeneous catalysis. Inertness to chemical environment and long-term photostability has made  an important material in many practical applications.  is a wide band-gap semiconductor. It is commonly investigated in the rutile (bandgap 3.0 eV) and anatase (bandgap 3.2 eV) phases. Photocatalytic reactions are initiated by the absorption of illumination with energy equal to or greater than the band gap of the semiconductor. This produces electron-hole (e− /h+) pairs:

TiO2 ->[{hv}][{}] e-(TiO2) + h+(TiO2)

where the electron is in the conduction band and the hole is in the valence band. The irradiated  particle can behave as an electron donor or acceptor for molecules in contact with the semiconductor. It can participate in redox reactions with adsorbed species, as the valence band hole is strongly oxidizing while the conduction band electron is strongly reducing.

Plasmonic antenna-reactor photocatalysis 
A plasmonic antenna-reactor photocatalyst is a photocatalyst that combines a catalyst with attached antenna that increases the catalyst's ability to absorb light, thereby increasing its efficiency.

A  catalyst combined with an Au light absorber accelerated hydrogen sulfide-to-hydrogen reactions.

A Fe catalyst combined with a Cu light absorber can produce hydrogen from ammonia at ambient temperature using visible light.

Applications 
Most suffer from the fact that they can only perform under UV irradiation due to their band structure. Other photocatalysts, including a graphene-ZnO nanocompound counter this problem.

Paper 
Micro-sized ZnO tetrapodal particles added to pilot paper production. The most common are one-dimensional nanostructures, such as nanorods, nanotubes, nanofibers, nanowires, but also nanoplates, nanosheets, nanospheres, tetrapods. ZnO is strongly oxidative, chemically stabile, with enhanced photocatalytic activity, and has a large free-exciton binding energy. It is non-toxic, abundant, biocompatible, biodegradable, environmentally friendly, low cost, and compatible with simple chemical synthesis. ZnO faces limits to its widespread use in photocatalysis under solar radiation. Several approaches have been suggested to overcome this limitation, including doping for reducing the band gap and improving charge carrier separation.

Water splitting 

Photocatalytic water splitting separates water into hydrogen and oxygen: 

The most prevalently investigated material, is inefficient. NiO allows a significant explоitation of the visible spectrum. One efficient photocatalyst in the UV range is based on sodium tantalite (NaTaO3) doped with lanthanum and loaded with a nickel oxide cocatalyst. The surface is grooved with nanosteps from doping with lanthanum (3–15 nm range, see nanotechnology). The NiO particles are present on the edges, with the oxygen evolving from the grooves.

Self-cleaning glass 
Titanium dioxide takes part in self-cleaning glass. Free radicals generated from  oxidize organic matter. The rough wedge-like  surface can be modified with a hydrophobic monolayer of octadecylphosphonic acid (ODP).  surfaces that were plasma etched for 10 seconds and subsequent surface modifications with ODP showed a water contact angle greater than 150◦. The surface was converted into a superhydrophilic surface (water contact angle = 0◦) upon UV illumination, due to rapid decomposition of octadecylphosphonic acid coating resulting from  photocatalysis. Due to  's wide band gap, light absorption by the semiconductor material and resulting superhydrophilic conversion of undoped  requires ultraviolet radiation (wavelength <390 nm) and thereby restricts self-cleaning to outdoor applications.

Disinfection and cleaning 

 Water disinfection/decontamination, a form of solar water disinfection (SODIS). Adsorbents attract organics such as tetrachloroethylene. Adsorbents are placed in packed beds for 18 hours. Spent adsorbents are placed in regeneration fluid, essentially removing organics still attached by passing hot water opposite to the flow of water during adsorption. The regeneration fluid passes through fixed beds of silica gel photocatalysts to remove and decompose remaining organics.
 self-sterilizing coatings (for application to food contact surfaces and in other environments where microbial pathogens spread by indirect contact). 
Magnetic  nanoparticle oxidation of organic contaminants agitated using a magnetic field.
Sterilization of surgical instruments and removal of fingerprints from electrical and optical components.

Hydrocarbon production from  
 conversion of  into gaseous hydrocarbons. The proposed reaction mechanisms involve the creation of a highly reactive carbon radical from carbon monoxide and carbon dioxide which then reacts with photogenerated protons to ultimately form methane. Efficiencies of  -based photocatalysts are low, although nanostructures such as carbon nanotubes and metallic nanoparticles help.

Paints 
ePaint is a less-toxic alternative to conventional antifouling marine paints that generates hydrogen peroxide.

Photocatalysis of organic reactions by polypyridyl complexes, porphyrins, or other dyes can produce materials inaccessible by classical approaches. Most photocatalytic dye degradation studies have employed . The anatase form of  has higher photon absorption characteristics.

Filtration membranes 
Antifouling coatings for filtration membranes, can act as a separation layer for contaminant degradation. or Cr(VI) removal.

Construction 
Light2CAT was a project funded by the European Commission from 2012 to 2015. It aimed to develop a modified  that can absorb visible light and include this modified  into construction concrete. The  degrades harmful pollutants such as NOx into NO3−. The modified  was utilized in Copenhagen and Holbæk, Denmark, and Valencia, Spain. This “self-cleaning” concrete led to a 5-20% reduction in NOx over the course of a year.

Quantification 

ISO 22197-1:2007 specifies a test method for the measurement of  removal for materials that contain a photocatalyst or have superficial photocatalytic films.

Specific FTIR systems are used to characterize photocatalytic activity or passivity, especially with respect to volatile organic compounds, and representative binder matrices.

Mass spectrometry allows measurement of photocatalytic activity by tracking the decomposition of gaseous pollutants such as nitrogen NOx or

See also
Light harvesting materials
Photoelectrochemical cell
Photolysis
Photocatalytic water splitting
 Photoredox catalysis
Photoelectrochemical oxidation
Photosensitizer

References

Photochemistry
Catalysis